Ulunma Jerome (born 11 April 1988) is a Nigerian footballer who plays as a defender for Piteå of the Swedish Damallsvenskan. Jerome has also made several appearances for the Nigeria women's national football team.  Her debut was in the Damallsvenskan on 13 April 2011 against Linköping.

References

External links

Profile at Sports-reference.com

1988 births
Living people
Women's association football defenders
Nigerian women's footballers
Nigeria women's international footballers
2007 FIFA Women's World Cup players
2011 FIFA Women's World Cup players
Olympic footballers of Nigeria
Footballers at the 2008 Summer Olympics
Damallsvenskan players
Piteå IF (women) players
Nigerian expatriate women's footballers
Nigerian expatriate sportspeople in Sweden
Expatriate women's footballers in Sweden
Rivers Angels F.C. players
21st-century Nigerian women